David M. Strom (born about 1959) is an experimental high energy particle physicist on the faculty of the University of Oregon.

Early life and education 
Strom was born in Montana in 1957, the son of Kathryn Jean (née Mattill) and Herbert Edward Strom. He was awarded a B.A. in Physics and Mathematics in 1980 at St. Olaf College. He earned a Ph.D. in Physics in 1986 at the University of Wisconsin–Madison, with his dissertation, Measurement of the D0 lifetime, advised by Sau Lan Wu.

Strom is married to Katja Heide, and they have two sons.

Career 
After earning his Ph.D., Strom was a research associate at Madison for a year. He was a McCormick Fellow at the University of Chicago for two years, and he became a research associate there from 1989–1991.

Strom joined the physics faculty at the University of Oregon in 1991. He researches topics in experimental high energy physics, including "Quantum black hole production in proton-proton collisions, Higgs (in beyond the Standard Model Scenarios), triggering at hadron colliders, detectors and electronics for linear colliders, precision electroweak measurements, ATLAS".

From 2001–2002, Strom served as a member of the University Senate at the University of Oregon.

In Spring 2011, Strom was elected by the ATLAS Collaboration Board as deputy trigger coordinator  for the ATLAS experiment at CERN's Large Hadron Collider. After serving as deputy trigger coordinator, Strom assumed the role of trigger coordinator in late 2011. The University of Oregon's Physics News said, "The ATLAS detector is massive, stretching about 150 feet long and more than 80 feet high. It is about half as big as the Notre Dame Cathedral in Paris and weighs close to 7,000 tons, the same as the Eiffel Tower or a hundred 747 jets."

Eric Tucker reported,

On 4 July 2012, CERN announced the discovery of the Higgs Boson by the ATLAS and CMS experiments.

Selected publications 
Strom has principally participated in research collaborations of ATLAS, Linear Collider physics, BABAR, and OPAL.

ATLAS Collaboration

Linear Collider

BABAR Collaboration

OPAL

Awards, honors 
In 2017 Strom was elected a Fellow of the American Physical Society, cited "for leadership on the ATLAS experiment, particularly related to trigger and data acquisition, and for contributions to the ATLAS physics outcomes, including the discovery of the Higgs boson".

References

External links 
Charged particle detectors, a slide presentation by David M. Strom.

1957 births
21st-century American physicists
Fellows of the American Physical Society
Living people
University of Oregon faculty